20th Corps, Twentieth Corps, or XX Corps may refer to:

 XX Corps (German Empire)
 XX Corps (Ottoman Empire)
 XX Corps (United Kingdom)
 XX Corps (United States)
 XX Corps (Union Army), a unit in the American Civil War
 XX Army Corps (Wehrmacht)
 XX Motorised Corps (Italy)
 20th Army Corps (Russian Empire)

See also
 List of military corps by number 
 20th Army (disambiguation)
 20th Brigade (disambiguation)
 20th Division (disambiguation)
 20th Regiment (disambiguation)
 20 Squadron (disambiguation)